Beartown, Pennsylvania may refer to:
Beartown, Franklin County, Pennsylvania
Beartown, Lancaster County, Pennsylvania